Rivoli is a surname. Notable people with the surname include:

Paulina Rivoli (1823–1881), Polish operatic soprano
Pietra Rivoli, author and Georgetown University professor of finance and international business